

Explorations
 Historic American Engineering Record surveys the original main line of the Baltimore and Ohio Railroad.

Excavations
 June - Wreck of Spanish Armada ship El Gran Grifón off Fair Isle excavated by Colin Martin and Sydney Wignall.
  Joint British Museum, Harvard University and University of Cambridge project begins at Maya site of Lubaantun under leadership of Norman Hammond.
 Five-year project at Altun Ha, led by Dr. David Pendergast of the Royal Ontario Museum, ends.
 Retrieval of artefacts from wreck of Batavia off Western Australia begins.
 Joint Archaeological Survey of India and University of Cambridge excavations at Malvan in Gujarat.
 Alepotrypa cave in Greece.

Publications
 P. V. Glob - Hojfolket: Bronzealderens mennesker bevaret i 3000 år (The Mound People: Danish bronze-age man preserved).

Finds
 July - Heilongjiang hand cannon, dating from c. 1288, discovered by Wei Guozhong in Manchuria.
 October 21 - Loose timber from the wreck of the Tudor warship Mary Rose found in the Solent off the coast of England.
 First Botorrita plaque.
 Sweet Track discovered by John Sweet in the Somerset Levels of England.
 Blackfriars Ships III and IV discovered by Peter Marsden in London.
 Submarine CSS H. L. Hunley (sunk in action 1864) is claimed to be located in Charleston Harbor, South Carolina, by E. Lee Spence.
 Buckquoy spindle-whorl, dating from the Early Middle Ages, probably the 8th century, excavated in Buckquoy, Birsay, Orkney, Scotland; notable because of its Ogham inscription.

Awards

Events
 July 12 - Thor Heyerdahl's papyrus boat Ra II arrives in Barbados after a 57-day voyage from Morocco.
 Butser Ancient Farm set up as an experimental archaeology site by the Council for British Archaeology.

Births

March 9 – Fereidoun Biglari, Iranian archaeologist and museum curator

Deaths
 May 6 - Sir John Beazley, British Classical archaeologist (b. 1885)
 May 29 - Jaroslav Černý, Czech-British Egyptologist (b. 1898)

See also
 List of years in archaeology
 1969 in archaeology
 1971 in archaeology

References

Archaeology
 
Archaeology by year